The Night They Killed Rasputin, also known as Nights of Rasputin, is a 1960 Italian-French historical adventure film co-written and directed  by Pierre Chenal, and starring Edmund Purdom and Gianna Maria Canale.

Plot

Cast 

 Edmund Purdom as Grigori Rasputin
 Gianna Maria Canale as  Czarina Alexandra
 John Drew Barrymore as Prince Felix Yousoupoff 
 Ugo Sasso as Nicholas II of Russia
 Jany Clair as  Irina Jussupoff 
 Yvette Lebon as  Gousseva
 Elida Dey as Tania Selevska
 Giulia Rubini as Vera Corali
 Livio Lorenzon as Belesky
 Nerio Bernardi as Commissioner
 Miranda Campa as Maria
 Marco Guglielmi as Médecin
 Maria Grazia Buccella as Amie de Yousoupoff
 Jole Fierro  
 Ivo Garrani
 Feodor Chaliapin Jr. 
 Enrico Glori 
 Michele Malaspina

References

External links

1960s historical adventure films
1960s biographical films
Italian historical adventure films
Italian biographical films
French historical adventure films
French biographical films
Films directed by Pierre Chenal
Films set in the 1910s
Films set in Russia
Films about assassinations
Films about Grigori Rasputin
Cultural depictions of Nicholas II of Russia
1960s Italian-language films
1960s French films
1960s Italian films